Pat Convery (1896 – 17 May 1968) was an Irish water polo player. He competed in the men's tournament at the 1924 Summer Olympics.

References

External links
 

1896 births
1968 deaths
Irish male water polo players
Olympic water polo players of Ireland
Water polo players at the 1924 Summer Olympics
Place of birth missing